Chizongwe Secondary School is a secondary (technical) school located north of Chipata, Eastern Province, Zambia. It was founded in the 1950s as Fort Jameson Trades School. It is the only technical school in Eastern Province.

During 1959 and 1960, Fort Jameson Trades School was involved in student protests against racial practices and the existence of the Federation of Rhodesia and Nyasaland, the latter being probed by the Monckton Commission.

Between 1966 and 1980 it was amongst the top five secondary schools in Zambia together with Munali (Lusaka), Linda High School (Livingstone), David Kaunda (Lusaka) and Luanshya Boys (Luanshya) and is still these days considered a school of excellence.

References

Secondary schools in Zambia
Educational institutions established in 1957
1957 establishments in Northern Rhodesia
Eastern Province, Zambia